Project stakeholders are persons or entities who have an interest in a given project. According to the Project Management Institute (PMI), the term project stakeholder refers to "an individual, group, or organization, who may affect, be affected by, or perceive itself to be affected by a decision, activity, or outcome of a project". ISO 21500 uses a similar definition.

Stakeholders may be located inside or outside an organization, including:
 the project's sponsor;
 those with an interest or the potential to gain from the successful completion of a project;
anyone who may have a positive or negative influence in the project completion.

Example roles
The following are examples of project stakeholders:
 Project leader
 Senior management
 Project team members
 Project customer
 Resource managers
 Line managers
 Product user group
 Project testers
 Any group impacted by the project as it progresses
 Any group impacted by the project when it is completed
 Subcontractors to the project
 Consultants to the project

Rather than focusing on one subset of stakeholders, Lynda Bourne advocates prioritizing all stakeholders and focusing your attention on the "most important" at this point in time. Her view of importance encompasses an assessment of the power, proximity and urgency associated with each stakeholder. She calls her methodology a "Stakeholder Circle".

The rationale for this emphasis on decision makers is part of project stakeholder management and a key component in affecting change in an organization. John Hotter describes stakeholder analysis and stakeholder management as essential components of change management.

See also 
Stakeholder register

References

Further reading
Freeman, R E (1984), Strategic Management: a Stakeholder Approach, Pitman Series in Business and Public Policy, Harpercollins College Div; First Edition. 

Corporate finance
Project management

de:Stakeholder#Stakeholder im Projektmanagement